John Huh (born May 21, 1990) is an American professional golfer who plays on the PGA Tour. His sole victory on the PGA Tour came at the 2012 Mayakoba Golf Classic.

Amateur career
Huh was born in New York City to Korean parents. He moved to South Korea shortly after his birth and he lived there for 12 years, then moved to Chicago, Illinois for three years, and then to Los Angeles, California. He attended California State University, Northridge for two weeks before turning professional in 2008. Huh left college due to the lack of core courses, preventing him from receiving a scholarship and being approved for NCAA competition.

Professional career

Early career
With his college career ending before it began, Huh turned professional and played on the Korean Tour for three years. In 2010 he won the Shinhan Donghae Open and was named the 2010 Korean Tour Rookie of the Year. He also played on the OneAsia Tour in 2010 and 2011, finishing 46th and 15th on the Order of Merit, respectively. He earned his PGA Tour card for 2012 by finishing in a tie for 27th at qualifying school, making the cut on the number (two Nationwide Tour graduates were among the top 25, allowing Huh to earn a Tour card). Prior to qualifying school, Huh had no starts on a U.S.-based professional tour.

2012
In only his second PGA Tour event, Huh finished in a tie for 6th at the Farmers Insurance Open. He continued his strong play the following week when he finished in a tie for 12th at the Waste Management Phoenix Open. In only his fifth PGA Tour event, Huh picked up his first victory at the Mayakoba Golf Classic, defeating Robert Allenby in an eight-hole sudden death playoff. Allenby held a two stroke lead with one hole to play but double bogeyed after putting his tee shot in the trees, and a Huh par forced a playoff. The playoff tied the second longest playoff in PGA Tour history. Huh made the cut in his first six PGA Tour events. He was in contention at the Valero Texas Open, but fell two shots short of champion Ben Curtis and finished in a tie for second. Huh broke into the top-100 of the Official World Golf Ranking for the first time, moving to 90th. In May, Huh finished in a tie for fifth at the Crowne Plaza Invitational at Colonial. Huh played in his first major at the 2012 Open Championship, earning entry through FedEx Cup standings, where he missed the cut. He would also be the only rookie to advance to the 2012 Tour Championship, the fourth and final event of the FedEx Cup. Huh's performance was good enough for 28th on the money list, earning him entry into the 2013 Masters Tournament (top 30 money earners were given automatic entry). Huh won the PGA Tour Rookie of the Year for his 2012 season, the first person of Korean descent to win the honor.

2013
Huh was unable to repeat the success of 2012, but did well enough to go to the FedEx Cup. He finished T11 at the Masters and earned entry into the 2014 tournament. His best finish of the season was a T3 at the Wyndham Championship and reached a career high of 62nd in the OWGR.

2014
Huh had two T3 finishes (Valero Texas Open and Barracuda Championship) and finished 96th in the FedEx Cup.

2015
Despite no finish better than 17th, Huh finished 110th in the FedEx Cup.

2016
Huh's season best was a T-6 at the Waste Management Phoenix Open, en route to finishing 95th in the FedEx Cup.

2017 
Huh had two top-10 finishes (Shriners Hospitals for Children Open and Valspar Championship) and finished the season 121st in the FedEx Cup.

2018 
Huh's best performance was a T3 at the CareerBuilder Challenge, en route to a 112th place finish in the FedEx Cup. This marked his seventh straight season making the FedEx Cup playoffs.

2019 
Due to injuries, Huh competed in just 13 events, with only four made cuts. He ended the season 220th in the FedEx Cup.

2020 
In 8 events, Huh made the cut in 5 of them, but never finished higher than T40. He finished 213th in the FedEx Cup.

2021 
Huh played in 20 events, making 11 cuts. However, he had no top-10 finishes, and ended the season 153rd in the FedEx Cup. Huh entered the Korn Ferry Tour Finals, and his 7th place finish at the Korn Ferry Tour Championship resulted in a 11th place finish on the Korn Ferry Tour Finals points list. This enabled him regain his PGA Tour card for the 2022 season.

Professional wins (2)

PGA Tour wins (1)

PGA Tour playoff record (1–0)

Korean Tour wins (1)

Results in major championships
Results not in chronological order in 2020.

CUT = missed the half-way cut
"T" indicates a tie for a place
NT = No tournament due to COVID-19 pandemic

Summary

Most consecutive cuts made – 3 (2012 PGA – 2013 U.S. Open)
Longest streak of top-10s – 0

Results in The Players Championship

CUT = missed the halfway cut
"T" indicates a tie for a place
C = Canceled after the first round due to the COVID-19 pandemic

Results in World Golf Championships

"T" = Tied

See also
2011 PGA Tour Qualifying School graduates
2021 Korn Ferry Tour Finals graduates

References

External links

American male golfers
PGA Tour golfers
Sportspeople from New York City
Golfers from Chicago
Golfers from Los Angeles
1990 births
Living people